Damias obliqua is a moth of the family Erebidae first described by Rothschild and Jordan in 1901. It is found in New Guinea.

References

Damias
Moths described in 1901